Rediu is a commune in Galați County, Western Moldavia, Romania with a population of 3,909 people at the 2002 census. It is composed of two villages, Plevna and Rediu. Suhurlui village broke off as a separate commune in 2008.

References

Communes in Galați County
Localities in Western Moldavia